Óscar Montalvo Finetti (born 20 March 1937) is a former Peruvian football player, who played as a midfielder or as a winger.

Career 
Montalvo spent much of his career with Deportivo Municipal. He was one of the Deportivo players who participated together with a group of players from Sport Boys in the so-called Tour of Four Continents in 1960. He also played for Ciclista Lima.

In 1962, Montalvo was signed by the Spanish club Deportivo de La Coruña, for whom he played between 1962 and 1967. He them moved to Real Oviedo for a season until his retirement in 1968.

Montalvo made 7 appearances for the Peru national football team from 1959 to 1962. He was a member of the team which defeated England 4–1 in 1959, considered one of the best Peruvian performances ever, and played for Peru in the 1959 South American Championship. In his final international match, another friendly against England, he had a penalty saved by English goalkeeper Ron Springett. Because of the policy of the Peruvian Football Federation of only selecting domestic players for the national team, Montalvo's move to Spain effectively ended his international career.

Retirement 
After retiring as a player he returned to Peru and worked as a youth coach. One of the most famous players he developed was Jefferson Farfán. In 1988, he briefly managed the Peruvian club Sporting Cristal.

References 

1937 births
Living people
Association football midfielders
Peruvian footballers
Peru international footballers
Peruvian expatriate footballers
Peruvian expatriate sportspeople in Spain
Deportivo de La Coruña players
Expatriate footballers in Spain
Deportivo Municipal footballers
Ciclista Lima Association footballers
Real Oviedo players
Peruvian football managers
Sporting Cristal managers